Juan Francisco Undurraga Gazitúa (born 29 September 1965) is a politician currently serving as First Vice President of the Chamber of Deputies of Chile and as a member of the Chamber of Deputies representing District 11 of Santiago.

References

1965 births
Living people
People from Santiago
Members of the Chamber of Deputies of Chile
Evópoli politicians